The 1989–90 Montreal Canadiens season was the Canadiens' 81st season. The Canadiens were eliminated in the Adams Division final by the Boston Bruins 4 games to 1.

Offseason
Captain Bob Gainey retired in July 1989. The Canadiens named Guy Carbonneau and Chris Chelios co-captains, in August.
Meanwhile, longtime defenceman Larry Robinson signed with the Los Angeles Kings via free-agency.

NHL Draft
Montreal's draft picks at the 1989 NHL Entry Draft held at the Met Center in Bloomington, Minnesota.

Regular season

The Canadiens finished the regular season with only 234 goals allowed, second only to the Boston Bruins. Their power play struggled throughout the season and they finished last in power-play goals scored (54) and power-play percentage (15.88%). Although the Canadiens scored the fewest short-handed goals in the league, with 4, they only allowed 7, good enough for 4th place in the league (tied with the Buffalo Sabres and Edmonton Oilers).

Final standings

Schedule and results

Player statistics

Regular season
Scoring

Goaltending

Playoffs
Scoring

Goaltending

References
 Canadiens on Hockey Database
 Canadiens on NHL Reference

Montreal Canadiens seasons
Montreal Canadiens season, 1989-90
Montreal